B'z The Best "Treasure" is the fourth compilation album by the Japanese rock duo B'z. It includes many of their hit singles from 1990 to that date: all 14 songs are #1 hits.

The songs on this album were selected by a poll of B'z fans.

The album reached 1st at Oricon with over 2.5 million copies sold in its first week, and topped the charts for more two weeks. It has sold more than 4.4 million copies to date, making it the fifth best-selling album in Japanese music history.

Track listing 
Blowin' - 3:55
Koi-Gokoro - 3:49
Time - 4:57
Liar! Liar! - 3:23
 - 3:29
Itoshii Hitoyo Good Night... (愛しい人よGood Night...) - 6:15
Pleasure'98 -Jinsei no Kairaku- (Pleasure'98 ~人生の快楽~) -  4:44
Mienai Chikara -Invisible One- (ミエナイチカラ -Invisible One-) - 4:41
Mou Ichidou Kiss Shitakatta (もう一度キスしたかった) - 4:39
Fireball - 4:14
Real Thing Shakes - 4:14
Motel - 4:23
Itsuka no Meriikurisumasu (いつかのメリークリスマス Merry Christmas) - 5:38
RUN -1998 style- - 5:49
Tracks 4, 10 from the album Survive. Track 5 from the album Loose. Track 6 from the album Risky.

Certifications

References

External links 
 

B'z compilation albums
1998 compilation albums